Jack Oliver may refer to:
Jack Oliver (record executive), British president of Apple Records, 1969–1971
Jack Oliver (scientist) (1923–2011), American geophysicist
Jack Oliver (weightlifter) (born 1991), British weightlifter
Jack Edward Oliver (1942–2007), British cartoonist
Jack P. Oliver, former Republican member of the Ohio House of Representatives

See also
Keith Jack Oliver, better known as Jackie Oliver (born 1942), British former Formula One driver and team owner
John Oliver (disambiguation)